Büyükçiftlik is a municipality (belde) in Yüksekova District in Hakkâri Province in Turkey. The belde is populated by Kurds of the Pinyanişî tribe and had a population of 3,296 in 2022.

History 
In 1947, Büyükçiftlik was described as a rapidly growing village with a beautiful scenery including a nearby forest and a two-thousander mountain. The village was moreover described as having natural assets and suitable for touristic attraction.

Population 
Population history of the municipality from 2000 to 2022:

References 

Populated places in Hakkâri Province
Kurdish settlements in Hakkâri Province